Party Builder, also published as Party, was a monthly English language newspaper published in Sydney, by the Communist Party of Australia from June 1942.

Newspaper history 
The first issue, printed on 1 June 1942, was titled Party. Subsequent issues were published as Party Builder up until 1 July 1965. It was published as an internal newspaper for the Central Committee of the Communist Party of Australia.

Digitisation 
The paper has been partially digitised as part of the Australian Newspapers Digitisation Program of the National Library of Australia.

See also 
 List of newspapers in Australia
 List of newspapers in New South Wales

References

External links 
 
 

Defunct newspapers published in Sydney
Communism in Australia
Communist newspapers
Newspapers established in 1942
Publications disestablished in 1956